Jouvet is a French surname. It may refer to:

 Émilie Jouvet (born 1976), French artist
 Louis Jouvet, French actor and theatre director
 Maurice Jouvet (1923–1999), French-Argentine actor
 Michel Jouvet (1925–2017), French neuroscientist
 , Argentine actress

Surnames of French origin